The Hillsborough River is a river located in the state of Florida in the United States. It arises in the Green Swamp near the juncture of Hillsborough, Pasco and Polk counties, and flows  through Pasco and Hillsborough Counties to an outlet in the city of Tampa on Hillsborough Bay. The name Hillsborough River first appeared on a British map in 1769. At the time, the Earl of Hillsborough was the British Secretary of State for the Colonies, and thus controlled the pensions of the surveyors working in the American colonies, which included East Florida.

History
Geological data estimates that the Hillsborough River has been flowing for about 27,000 years. It is estimated humans first made their way to this area 12,000 - 15,000 years ago.

In the late 18th century the watershed of the Hillsborough River was a land covered by a rich, old-growth forest. Majestic bald cypress, longleaf pine, and sand live oak were hundreds of years old (and in the case of cypress, thousands of years old). In the mid to late 19th century to about 1913 the watershed of this old growth forest began to be logged. As a result of this lumbering activity, most of the trees within the Hillsborough River basin are now less than 100 years in age.  The harvesting of the old growth trees altered the ecosystems they dominated. Trees such as water ash and water locust were able to quickly grow in the sun-lit spaces created when bigger trees were removed.  The riverine swamp forest as it exists today has a much different ecology than the ecosystem that had existed along the Hillsborough for the previous ten to 15,000 years.

When Europeans first reached Florida, the area around Tampa Bay and all of the watershed of the Hillsborough River was occupied by people of the Safety Harbor culture. Two chiefdoms of the Safety Harbor culture, Mocoso and Pohoy, were adjacent to where the Hillsborough River entered Tampa Bay. Hernando de Soto landed on the south side of Tampa Bay in 1539 and passed through Mocoso on his way north. By the early 18th century the people of the Safety Harbor culture, through disease and slavery, are nearly exterminated.

Timeline

(1757) A survey of the Hillsborough River is done by Don Francisco Maria Celi, pilot of the
Spanish Royal Fleet.  He ventures up to the Temple Terrace area in search of longleaf pine to use as masts for his ships.  He names the pine forest of the area "El Pinal de la Cruz de Santa Teresa" or "The Pines of the Cross of Saint Teresa".  There is a plaque commemorating his exploration at Riverhills Park in Temple Terrace.

(1772) A map drawn and sent to the Earl of Hillsborough, English Governor of West Florida, shows the river named as the Hillsborough. During the mid and late 18th century, Native Americans from the north, mostly Creek, begin to migrate to Florida. These immigrants become known as Seminoles.

(1821) Florida becomes a United States territory.

(1824) Construction of Fort Brooke begins at the mouth of the Hillsborough River.

(1828) The Fort King Military Road (now State Road 41) is built to connect Fort King in Ocala with Fort Brooke in what was then the settlement of Tampa. A bridge is built to cross the Hillsborough.

(1830) Congress passes the Indian Removal Act. The American government begins efforts to remove the Seminole from Tampa Bay and relocate them to a reservation west of the Mississippi. Tensions between Seminole and Americans continue.

(1835) Seminoles burn the bridge at the Fort King Road's river crossing. Conflict continues.

(1836) Fort Foster is established at the Hillsborough River crossing to protect this
strategically advantageous position.

(1842) The Armed Occupation Act promises one hundred  of land to any man who can bear arms, build a house and cultivate  for five years.

(1843) The Jean Street Shipyard is founded on the Hillsborough River in what will be the neighborhood of Seminole Heights.

(1846) The first ferry crossing on the Hillsborough River is established. This improves
transportation and widens the growth of Tampa to both sides of the river.

(1861) During the American Civil War, Tampa Bay is blockaded by federal troops to prevent goods from leaving Tampa or from coming into Tampa.

(1863) Federal troops march upriver to a location near the present day site of Lowry Park Zoo.  There they discover a blockade-running steamer and sloop loaded with cotton. The ships are burned. The skirmish that follows is the only Civil War action on the Hillsborough River.

(1891) The Tampa Bay Hotel, now the Henry B. Plant Museum, opens with a grand ball.

(1897) At a cost of $150,000 an electrical dam is built on the river by Consumers Electric Light and Street Railway Company. The dam was located halfway between present-day 40th Street and 56th Street on the Hillsborough River (today's Temple Crest neighborhood.)

(1898) On December 13, 1898 the dam is dynamited by cattle barons angry at the loss of grazing land. They tried three times.  The first on January 8, 1897,shortly after construction was completed.  When the water is low, remnants of the dynamited dam can be seen.

(1898–99) TECO buys the Consumers Electric Light and Street Railway Company and builds a new electric generating dam downstream of the current site north of Sulphur Springs.

(1899) Tampa's first water plant is built by the private Tampa Waterworks Company. It pumped well water to supply the City of Tampa until March 6, 1923, when the people voted to purchase the Waterworks plant.

(1900) The Sulphur Springs (Sulphur Springs, Tampa, Florida) property is developed and open to the public.

(1910) Hillsborough Bay is channelized to the mouth of the Hillsborough River with the Rivers and Harbors Act of 1899.  Up to 1913 the Hillsborough River watershed is heavily logged for its valuable cypress, longleaf pine and oak.

(1911–1914) Bertha Potter Palmer (Bertha Palmer) (of Chicago and Sarasota) completes purchases of  bordering the Hillsborough River in present-day Temple Terrace, Temple Crest, Terrace Park, Busch Gardens and the University of South Florida area.  She calls her property "Riverhills Ranch", an exclusive hunting preserve where she builds a lodge and guest houses among other structures.  She dies in 1918.

(1922) The Temple Terrace Golf and County Club, located on the river in Temple Terrace opens with a Washington Ball.

(1923) The city of Tampa builds a water treatment plant to utilize the water supply from the water above the dam.

(1935) Hillsborough River State Park is opened.

(1933) In a torrential 24-hour rain, floods wash away the Tampa Electric dam. TECO does not rebuild the dam and turns to other locations for electrical generating plants.

(1944) The city of Tampa completes construction on the current dam, to be used for the purpose of containing drinking water for the city, at the site of the old TECO dam.  The old Tampa Waterworks Company is abandoned.

(1961) The Southwest Florida Water Management District (SWFWMD) is created.

It includes a constructed canal and several concrete flood-control structures. During construction of the Tampa Bypass Canal the aquifer is accidentally breached.

(1979) The Hillsborough River is closed to swimming at Hillsborough River State Park and a swimming pool is built for public use.

(1982) Lettuce Lake Park opens on the river just north of Temple Terrace

(1986) The Hillsborough River Interlocal Planning Board & Technical Advisory Council is established.

(1986) Sulphur Springs pool (Sulphur Springs, Tampa, Florida) is closed.

(1988) The annual Hillsborough River Cleanup begins.

(1991) Canoe Escape is opened and the owners donate canoes and time to bring the Hillsborough River to the public's attention.

(1992) The Hillsborough River Greenways Taskforce is established.

(1995) The Hillsborough River is designated as Outstanding Florida Waters.

(1995) The Hillsborough River is designated as a Florida Recreational Canoe Trail.

(1995) The Hillsborough River is named a Florida Sesquicentennial Greenway.

(2000) On the day after a massive Earth Day celebration at Lowry Park, highlighted by a "Flow-tilla" of dozens of boats from the Rowlett Park dam to Lowry Park, Friends of the River settles its legal challenge with agreement with SWFWMD, City of Tampa and Robert Thomas of Zephyrhills Water to study the river for 5 years to scientifically determine exactly how much freshwater is needed to restore and maintain the river's estuarine function. Findings of the 5-year study to be used by SWFWMD as sole basis for modification of minimum flow.

(2002) Tampa Bay Water places a pipeline to the Morris Bridge Sink (http://www.reedconstructiondata.com/projects/1001008567/)

(2006) "The Hillsborough River Task Force", Temple Terrace, is created.

(2007) Alan Wright, "Mr River", dies of cancer, December 21.

(2007) "The Lower Hillsborough River Minimum Flow Recovery Strategy" is adopted, based upon SWFWMD's 5-year study that documented a need for freshwater over twice that provided by its original rule as challenged by Friends of the River. Daily minimum flow begins December 31, 2007.

The river today
The Hillsborough River is home to many species, and several large bird rookeries exist. When local students reach sixth grade in Hillsborough County, they take a visit to the river for one to three days to learn about the ecosystem, watershed, and native Florida animals at a place called 'Nature's Classroom'. The Hillsborough River dam (originally built in 1895 and since rebuilt) at Rowlett Park creates a lake covering  and containing  of water, providing for the supply of water for the City of Tampa. The Hillsborough River was immortalized in 1973 by author Gloria Jahoda in her book River of the Golden Ibis.

With the construction of the dam in 1945, the portion of the River above the dam to approximately Fletcher Avenue is where the City of Tampa is permitted to withdraw water to supply to its citizens and those in Hillsborough County. In addition, Tampa Bay Water is permitted to withdraw water from the River during "high flow" times and under specific conditions.  The Southwest Florida Water Management District, the agency required by Florida law to protect and manage the waters in the state, authorizes the permits.

With the establishment of the minimum flow of the upper and middle river by the Southwest Florida Water Management District in 2007 and its supporting Recovery Strategy, the City of Tampa and the District in partnership are implementing measures and projects to achieve the required flow in the lower river, while preserving the pristine nature of the middle and upper rivers.

The river above the dam to roughly the 56th Street bridge passes through the neighborhood of Temple Crest.  The river above the 56th Street bridge passes through the City of Temple Terrace and it is one of the many scenic portions of the river. The City has a river cleanup of its river portion twice a year.

Hillsborough River State Park
Hillsborough River State Park includes  along the Hillsborough River in northeastern Hillsborough County. It supports many Floridian environments such as swamps and oak hammocks and many endangered species. The park's purpose is to preserve the "real Florida". Visitors to the park can participate in picnicking, camping, canoeing, hiking, fishing and swimming in a constructed pool. There is also a designated place to observe the river's class II rapids. It is one of the only rivers in Florida with rapids. The park opened in 1935 making it one of Florida's oldest state parks.

The middle river
The middle river is the portion of the river north of the dam at 30th Street and is the primary source of water for the City of Tampa. The middle river is located in the middle portion of the river extending from its dam with the water contained back to Fletcher Avenue. The Hillsborough River has its headwaters begins in the Green Swamp and ultimately flows into Tampa Bay.

Water was supplied in Tampa's early days by private wells, cisterns and tanks. Tampa's first water plant went into operation on April 20, 1899, operated by the private Tampa Waterworks Company. It pumped well water to supply the City of Tampa until March 6, 1923, when the people voted to purchase the Waterworks plant for the city. The middle river has been Tampa's official source of water since 1944.

But the middle river is far more than just the source for some of Tampa's drinking water, it is a wonderfully diverse river ecosystem within the larger urban area surrounding it. Orange Lake, in the Temple Crest neighborhood, is an Audubon Society bird nesting and sanctuary, is also a living wetlands.

Upstream along the banks of Temple Terrace's Riverhills Park is a scene from old Florida, with cypress trees dotting the watery landscape.

Recreation
A  canoe trail is designated by the State of Florida, starting at Hillsborough River State Park and ending at Rowlett Park in Tampa. Morris Bridge Park, Trout Creek Wilderness Park, Hillsborough River State Park Lettuce Lake Park, Riverfront Park, Riverhills Park, Angel of Hope Park, Rogers Park, Sulphur Springs Water Tower, and Rivercrest Park are all located along the Hillsborough River.

List of crossings

References

Gunter, Booth. 1990. Hillsborough River. in Marth, Del and Marty Marth, eds. The Rivers of Florida. Sarasota, Florida: Pineapple Press. .

External links

 Watershed Excursion of the Hillsborough River (digital tour) from the Southwest Florida Water Management District
 Hillsborough River State Park official website from Florida State Parks

Rivers of Florida
Outstanding Florida Waters
Rivers of Hillsborough County, Florida
Rivers of Polk County, Florida
Bodies of water of Pasco County, Florida
Tributaries of Tampa Bay